The 2022 UEFA Women's Under-17 Championship qualifying competition was a women's under-17 football competition that determined the seven teams joining the automatically qualified hosts Bosnia and Herzegovina in the 2022 UEFA Women's Under-17 Championship final tournament.

49 teams, including hosts Bosnia and Herzegovina, entered the qualifying competition. Players born on or after 1 January 2005 were eligible to participate.

Format
From this season, UEFA implemented a new format for the women's U17 and U19 Euros, based on a league-style qualifying format.

The teams are divided in two leagues: League A and League B. In this first season of the new system, the teams were divided using coefficient rankings.

Each league will play two rounds:
Round 1: In each league, groups of 4 teams will play mini-tournaments. The winners of each mini-tournament in league B and the best runner-up will be promoted and the last-placed teams in league A mini-tournaments will be relegated.
Round 2: The seven winners of League A will qualify for the final tournament. The six winners of mini-tournaments in league B and the best runner-up will be promoted and the last-placed teams in league A will be relegated for Round 1 of the next edition of the tournament.

Tiebreakers
In Round 1 and Round 2, teams are ranked according to points (3 points for a win, 1 point for a draw, 0 points for a loss), and if tied on points, the following tiebreaking criteria are applied, in the order given, to determine the rankings (Regulations Articles 17.01 and 17.02):
Points in head-to-head matches among tied teams;
Goal difference in head-to-head matches among tied teams;
Goals scored in head-to-head matches among tied teams;
If more than two teams are tied, and after applying all head-to-head criteria above, a subset of teams are still tied, all head-to-head criteria above are reapplied exclusively to this subset of teams;
Goal difference in all group matches;
Goals scored in all group matches;
Penalty shoot-out if only two teams have the same number of points, and they met in the last round of the group and are tied after applying all criteria above (not used if more than two teams have the same number of points, or if their rankings are not relevant for qualification for the next stage);
Disciplinary points (red card = 3 points, yellow card = 1 point, expulsion for two yellow cards in one match = 3 points);
Position in the applicable ranking:
for teams in round 1, position in the coefficient rankings;
for teams in round 2, position in the round 1 league ranking.

To determine the five best third-placed teams from the qualifying round, the results against the teams in fourth place are discarded. The following criteria are applied (Regulations Article 15.01):
Points;
Goal difference;
Goals scored;
Disciplinary points;
Position in the applicable ranking:
for teams in round 1, position in the coefficient rankings;
for teams in round 2, position in the round 1 league ranking.

Round 1

Draw
The draw for the qualifying round was held on 11 March 2021, 13:30 CET (UTC+1), at the UEFA headquarters in Nyon, Switzerland.

The teams were seeded according to their coefficient ranking, calculated based on the following :

2015 UEFA Women's Under-17 Championship final tournament and qualifying competition (qualifying round and elite round)
2016 UEFA Women's Under-17 Championship final tournament and qualifying competition (qualifying round and elite round)
2017 UEFA Women's Under-17 Championship final tournament and qualifying competition (qualifying round and elite round)
2018 UEFA Women's Under-17 Championship final tournament and qualifying competition (qualifying round and elite round)

Each group contained one team from Pot A, one team from Pot B, one team from Pot C, and one team from Pot D. For political reasons, Armenia and Azerbaijan would not be drawn in the same group.

The 28 first teams in the coefficient ranking qualified for League A. Teams 29–49 qualified for League B.

League A
Times are CEST (UTC+2), as listed by UEFA (local times, if different, are in parentheses).

Group A1

Group A2

Group A3

Group A4

Group A5

Group A6

Group A7

League B

Group B1

Group B2

Group B3

Group B4

Group B5

Group B6

Ranking of second-placed teams
To determine the best runner-up, only the results of the runner-up teams against the first and third-placed teams in their group are taken into account.

Round 2

Draw
The 21 teams of Round 1 League A and the 7 teams of Round 2 League B (six group winners and the best runner-up) are drawn in seven groups of four teams.

The teams were seeded according to their results in the round 1 (Regulations Article 15.01).

Teams entering League A

Teams entering League B

League A
Times are CET/CEST, as listed by UEFA (local times, if different, are in parentheses).

Group A1

Group A2

Group A3

Group A4

Group A5

Group A6

Group A7

League B
Times are CET/CEST, as listed by UEFA (local times, if different, are in parentheses).

Group B1

Group B2

Group B3

Group B4

Group B5

Group B6

Ranking of second-placed teams
To determine the best runner-up, only the results of the runner-up teams against the first and third-placed teams in their group are taken into account.

Qualified teams
The following eight teams qualified to the final tournament.

1 Bold indicates champions for that year. Italic indicates hosts for that year.

Goalscorers
In Round 1 

In Round 2 

In total,

References

External links

Notes

Qualification
2022
2021 in women's association football
2022 in women's association football
2021 in youth association football
2022 in youth association football
Sports events affected by the 2022 Russian invasion of Ukraine